Londonistan: How Britain is Creating a Terror State Within is a 2006 best-selling book by the British journalist Melanie Phillips about the spread of Islamism in the United Kingdom over the previous twenty years. The book was published in London by Encounter Books.

Reception
According to Kenan Malik in The Independent, Phillips's arguments share some striking similarities with Islamists. He wrote that, "Both insist that we are in a religious world war between the forces of good and evil. Both believe that only religion can help restrain decadent behaviour and establish a proper moral framework. Both abhor the growth of secular humanism. Both see Britain as "a debauched and disorderly culture of instant gratification, with disintegrating families, feral children and violence, squalor and vulgarity on the streets".

Describing the book in The American Conservative magazine, the writer Theodore Dalrymple wrote "the British journalist Melanie Phillips documents not only the establishment and growth of Muslim extremist groups in London but the administrative incompetence and cultural weakness that permitted it to happen. Some pusillanimity that she records would be funny if it were not so deeply disturbing."

Writing for The Daily Telegraph, the historian and writer Michael Burleigh decided that the book could not be more "timely" and praised her "sensible suggestions".

David Smith, writing for The Observer, compared Phillips to "a crazed boxer" who "comes out swinging wildly and some of her punches land. ... But her shrill, hectoring tone does her no favours." Smith also claims that Phillips is wrong to say that piggy banks were banished from British banks in case Muslims were offended, "a small point, perhaps, but a telling one".

Phillips has been noted to have praised the scholarship of Bat Ye'or, and Londonistan has been described by Christopher Othen as "her own book about the localised version of Eurabian dhimmitude all around her".

See also

Criticism of multiculturalism
Eurabia
Islamism in London
The Islamist
Islamist demonstration outside Danish Embassy in London in 2006
Islamophobia
Londonistan
Londonstani
Undercover Mosque

References

Bibliography

External links
 Brendan O'Neill, "Losing the plot", book review, New Statesman, 12 June 2006
 Fahad Zafar, "Londonistan", book review, DAWN, 9 August 2009
 Interview at Madrid11.net
 Interview at The Guardian
 Video of Phillips discussing the book at the Heritage Foundation
 "Library Reverses Rejection of ‘Potentially Incendiary' Book", New York Sun
 Summary of book at WikiSummaries

2006 non-fiction books
2006 in London
Books about Islamism
Criticism of multiculturalism
Encounter Books books
Eurabia
Islamism in the United Kingdom
Religion in London